The Battle of Bazaleti (bazalet’is brdzola) was fought between the two rival Georgian parties centered respectively on Teimuraz I of Kakheti and his defiant noble Giorgi Saakadze in the fall of 1626.

The battle was a culmination of the power struggle that evolved after the Georgian nobles rallied behind Teimuraz and Saakadze and recovered much of eastern Georgian kingdoms of Kartli and Kakheti from the Iranian occupation. Shah Abbas I of Iran used the rivalry between Teimuraz and Saakadze to divide the Georgians into two opposing parties and to punish Saakadze who had formerly fought under the Iranian ranks.

In a pitched battle, Saakadze's backup man, Davit’ Gogrishvili, was killed and his demoralized forces were routed by the royal army. Saakadze fled to the Ottoman Empire where he was assassinated in 1629 after serving a brief but successful military career under Sultan Ibrahim I.

References 

1626 in Europe
Bazaleti
Bazaleti